West Berk Railway Station (Manx: Stashoon Raad Yiarn Berk Heear) was a station on the Manx Northern Railway, later owned and operated by the Isle of Man Railway; it served a small area near Kirk Michael in the Isle of Man and was an intermediate stopping place on a line that ran between St. John's and Ramsey.

Description and history
The halt was only short-lived and, while recorded in MNR documents, its exact location is not known for certain other than as being adjacent to a level crossing.

Route

See also

 Isle of Man Railway stations
 Manx Northern Railway

References

Railway stations in the Isle of Man